In finance, an inverted yield curve happens when a yield curve graph of (typically) government bonds inverts and the shorter term bonds are offering a higher yield than the long-term bonds. Longer maturity bonds usually have a higher percent yield return because they are more risky because of volatility in the market, there could be a liquidity trap that wouldn't allow an investor to sell the bond security on the secondary market over the long run and they could get stuck with an underperforming asset. The inverted yield curve is one of the most reliable leading indicators for economic recession since at least 1955. The US Federal Reserve uses open market operations to adjust the Federal funds rate which pushes up short term bonds to catch the longer maturity bonds which are rising to catch up to inflation during the flattening of the yield curve. The inversion of the yield curve tends to predate a recession 7 to 24 months ahead of time.

History
The term 'inverted yield curve' was coined by the Canadian economist Campbell Harvey in his 1986 PhD thesis at Duke University.

Business cycles

The inverted yield curve is the contraction phase in the business cycle or credit cycle when the federal funds rate and Treasury interest rates are high to create a hard or soft landing in the cycle.  When the Federal funds rate and interest rates are lowered after the economic contraction (to get price and commodity stabilization) this is the growth and expansion phase in the business cycle. The Federal Reserve only indirectly controls the money supply and it is the banks themselves that create new money by fractional-reserve banking when they make loans. By manipulating interest rates with the Federal funds rate and repurchase agreement (repo market) the Fed tries to control how much new money banks create.

Other countries bond yields that have inverted

Yield spreads

Yield spread is the difference between the quoted rates of return on two different investments and for the inverted yield curve it is United States Treasury Bonds. It is simply done by subtracting the percent yield on one bond vs another bond of a different duration.  For example a 30 year bond with a 6% yield minus a 2 year bond with a 4% yield would be a spread of 2% or 200 basis points. Another example would be a longer duration bond of 10 years at 3% minus a shorter duration bond of 3 months at 3.5% would be -0.5% or a negative yield spread.

See also
Austrian business cycle theory
Friedman's k-percent rule
Zero interest-rate policy
1970s commodities boom
2000s commodities boom
2020s commodities boom

References

Economics curves
Bond valuation
Yield (finance)
Public finance
Government finances in the United States
Government bonds issued by the United States
Government bonds